Captain Joseph Wakefield, soldier and penal administrator, of the 39th Regiment was the acting commandant of the second convict settlement at Norfolk Island, from November 1828 to 29 June 1829.

By this time there were about 200 convicts on the island. Several buildings had been constructed of locally produced timber, stone, shingles and lime, including a prisoners' barracks, three-storey barracks for troops, quarters for civil officers and a military hospital. The remains of some of these buildings can still be seen at Kingston. Wakefield was soon replaced by the man who had sought the commandant's position since 1825, James Morisset.

References
 Hazzard, Margaret, Punishment Short of Death: a history of the penal settlement at Norfolk Island, Melbourne, Hyland, 1984.

External links 

 Colonial Secretary's papers 1822-1877, State Library of Queensland- includes digitised letters written by Wakefield to the Colonial Secretary of New South Wales regarding Norfolk Island

Norfolk Island penal colony administrators
39th Regiment of Foot officers
Year of death missing
Year of birth missing